This list of Sephardi chief rabbis of the Land of Israel documents the rabbis who served as the spiritual leader of the Sephardic community in the Land of Israel from the mid-17th century to present. The Hebrew title for the position, Rishon LeZion (literally "First to Zion"), has been used since the beginning of the 17th century, and is sourced from a verse in Isaiah 41:27. Between 1842 and 1920 the position of Hakham Bashi of Palestine was officially recognised by the Ottoman and British governments.

17th century
 Moshe ben Yonatan Galante (1665–?)
 Moshe ibn Habib (1689–1696)

18th century
 Avraham Ben David Yitzhaki (1709–1729)
 Eliezer Ben Yaakov Nachum (c. 1730)
 Nissim Chaim Moshe Mizrachi (1748–1749)
 Israel Yaakov Algazi (c. 1754)
 Raphael Shmuel Meyuchas (1756–1771)
 Chaim Raphael Avraham Ben Asher (1771–1772)
 Yom Tov Algazi (1772–1802)

19th century
 Moshe Yosef Mordechai Meyuchas (1802–1806)
 Yaakov Moshe Ayash al-Maghrebi (1806–1817)
 Yaakov Korach (1817–1818)
 Raphael Yosef Hazan (1819–1821)
 Yom Tov Danon (1822–1823)
 Shlomo Moses Suzin (1824–1836)
 Yonah Moshe Navon (1836–1841)
 Yehuda Raphael Navon (1841–1842)
 Chaim Avraham Gagin (1842–1848) - first Hakham Bashi of Palestine recognized by Ottoman government.
 Yitzhak Kovo (1848–1854)
 Chaim Nissim Abulefia (1854–1861)
 Chaim David Hazan (1861–1869)
 Avraham Ashkenazi (1869–1880)
 Raphael Meir Panigel (1880–1892)
 Yaakov Shaul Elyashar (1893–1906)

20th century
 Yaakov Meir (1906)
 Eliyahu Moshe Panigel (1907)
 Moshe Franco (1911–1915)
 Chaim Moshe Elyashur (1914–1915)
 Nissin Yehuda Danun (1915–?)
 Yaakov Meir (1921–1939)
 Ben-Zion Meir Hai Uziel (1939–1954)
 Yitzhak Nissim (1955–1972)
 Ovadia Yosef (1973–1983)
 Mordechai Eliyahu (1983–1993)
 Eliyahu Bakshi-Doron (1993–2003)

21st century
 Shlomo Amar (2003—2013 )
 Yitzhak Yosef (2013—)

See also
 List of Jewish leaders in the Land of Israel
 Chief Rabbi of Jerusalem
 Old Yishuv

References

 
 
 
Lists of clerics
Sephardi chief rabbis
Israel religion-related lists
Sephardi Jewish culture in Israel